Iglehart is a surname. Notable people with the surname include:

Floyd Iglehart (1934–1987), American football player
Harriet S. Iglehart (1927-2021), American equestrian, philanthropist, writer
James Iglehart (born 1949), American actor 
James Monroe Iglehart (born 1974), American stage actor and singer
John K. Iglehart, American editor
Joseph Iglehart (1891–1979), American financier, media executive, and sports executive
Philip L. B. Iglehart (1913–1993), Chilean polo player
Stewart Iglehart (1910–1993), American rancher, ice hockey player, and polo player